The Public Prize ( is an annual film award, presented by Québec Cinéma as part of its annual Prix Iris, to honour the most popular film of the year among film audiences in Quebec.

First presented in 1999 as part of the Prix Jutra, the award was known as the Billet d'or ("Golden Ticket"), and was presented to the film that had been the most successful at the box office. When the awards program was relaunched as the Prix Iris, the Billet d'or was relaunched as the Prix Public, which now sees the five top-grossing films of the year submitted to a public vote to award the film that was most liked by audiences.

Due to the COVID-19 pandemic in Canada and its effects on film distribution in 2020, the 23rd Quebec Cinema Awards in 2021 did not limit the award to only the five top-grossing films of the year, but allowed the public to vote for their favourite among all 16 Quebec films that had received any commercial screenings at all in the previous year. Ten days after the initial announcement, the organization also decided to add all of the eligible documentary films to the vote as well, bringing the total number of nominees for the award to 29.

1990s

2000s

2010s

2020s

See also
Golden Screen Award

References

Awards established in 1999
Public Prize
Quebec-related lists
1999 establishments in Canada